Chaudhary Charan Singh Haryana Agricultural University is a public funded agricultural university located at Hisar in the Indian state of Haryana. It is the biggest agricultural university in Asia. It is named after India's fifth Prime Minister, Chaudhary Charan Singh.

It was initially a satellite campus of Punjab Agricultural University at Hisar.  It was established as a university by Haryana and Punjab Agricultural Universities Act, ratified 2 February 1970 and was named as Haryana Agricultural University. So basically it is considered as the first established university of state Haryana. On 31 October 1991, it was renamed as Chaudhary Charan Singh Haryana Agricultural University. A. L. Fletcher was the first vice-chancellor of the university.

The university publishes the largest number of research papers among agricultural universities in India. It won the Indian Council of Agricultural Research's Award for the Best Institute in 1997 and in 2017. It contributed significantly to Green Revolution and White Revolution in India.

Golden Jubilee Year celebrations started in the university on 2 February 2019 and ended on 1 February 2020 marking the 50 glorious years of service towards mankind.

History

According to the data maintained by the Government of India's Department of Statistics, the HAU's Department of Agronomy was established in 1930 and department of Entomology was founded in 1956 in Punjab Agricultural University.

In February 1948, the Punjab College of Veterinary Sciences was opened at Railway Road Hisar in a rented building which was shared with the Govt College Hisar from 1950 onward. In 1961, the Punjab College of Veterinary Sciences later moved to the Government Livestock Farm, Hisar and it eventually came under the Punjab Agricultural University (PAU) as a satellite campus when PAU was established in 1962. In 1962, the College of Agriculture was established. In 1964, the College of Basic Sciences and Humanities was established. In 1966, the College of Animal Sciences was established. In 1966, when Haryana was formed, it was declared as an autonomous institution. On 2 February 1970, it was ratified and established as a university by Haryana and Punjab Agricultural Universities Act, and was named as Haryana Agricultural University, with A. L. Fletcher as its first Vice-Chancellor. The four constituent colleges of HAU located at Hisar, namely, College of Agriculture, College of Basic Sciences, College of Animal Sciences and College of Veterinary Sciences became a part of Haryana Agricultural University. In 1971, A regional campus of the university was opened at Kaul in 1971. In 1972, the College of Sports and in 1973 the College of Home Science were established. In 1973, College of Home Sciences was added. On 31 October 1991, the HAU was renamed as Chaudhary Charan Singh Haryana Agricultural University. In 1992, the College of Agricultural Engineering was established.

In 2010, College of Veterinary Sciences and College of Animal Sciences were separated from the university and became a part of the newly formed Lala Lajpat Rai University of Veterinary and Animal Sciences (LUVAS).

Campus
It is located about 5 km from the Guru Jambheshwar University of Science and Technology; 4 km from the Blue Bird Lake; 2 km from the bus station along the National Highway 9, (old NH 10) 1 km from the town center & main market area; 100 meter from Mahabir Stadium; 1 km from Hisar Junction railway station, 6 km from the Hisar Airport; 167 km from the Indira Gandhi International Airport; 180 km from the New Delhi railway station; and 235 km from the Chandigarh International Airport.

The main campus of CCS HAU has four gates, Gate No-1 near Mahabir Stadium, Gate No-2 and Gate No-3 behind Campus School and next to Giri Centre respectively both on the MDR107 Balsamand road, and Gate No-4 on NH52 Rajgarh road.

The development plan of the university is based on the concept of a Central Campus Core around which academic buildings for various colleges, schools and departments, residential, recreational and common facilities such as Faculty House and Club, Farmers' Hostel, Students' Hostel, Hospital, Shopping Centre etc., are built. The buildings comprising the Core are Gandhi Bhawan, Nehru Library, Indira Gandhi Auditorium and the Administration Building, situated on three sides of great Plazza, the greater part of which is four feet above ground level.

The main campus of the university is situated at Hisar at a distance of162 km North-West of Delhi on National Highway No.10 and is 2 km from the railway station and 3 km from the Bus Stand.  University is spread over an area of 7219 Acres at Hisar and 1426 Acres at outstations. Area at Hisar under farms is 6483 Acres and under buildings and roads is 736 Acres.

HAU has a central campus core formed by Fletcher Bhawan, Gandhi Bhawan (built 1975–1978), Indira Gandhi Auditorium (built 1982–1985) and Nehru Library, around which the other buildings and facilities are built.

Facilities 

Spread over an area of 298 hectares, the university has four constituent colleges viz.  College of Agriculture, College of Agricultural Engineering & Technology, College of Basic Sciences & Humanities and College of Home Science. Each college building is a complete institution in itself having large number of lecture rooms, laboratories, auditorium, seminar rooms, audio-visual Laboratories, computer facilities etc.

To accommodate administrative staff, the university has an administrative block known as Fletcher Bhawan.  Directorate of Extension Education along with the Directorate of Publications is housed in a double storeyed spacious building named Gandhi Bhawan. Adjacent to Gandhi Bhawan is the Dean, Postgraduate Studies Block housing Dean PGS staff.

In addition to the colleges, the university campus has the following facilities:
 Fletcher Bhawan, the administrative block
 Campus school for the children of the faculty.
 Indira Gandhi Auditorium at HAU
 Gandhi Bhawan, serving as the Directorate of Extension Education
 HAU Campus Hospital, a 50-bed hospital for the university community.
 Government High School at HAU opened in 1980
 HAU Faculty Club 
 HAU Faculty House
 HAU Farmers' Hostel and Kisan Ashram for visiting farmers
 Residential Buildings (970 at Hisar and 242 at outstations) for staff and faculty
 Shopping Centre with grocery shops, banks, post office, book stores etc.
 HAU Community centre complex
 Academy of Agricultural Research and Education Management (AAREM) 
 HAU Counselling and Placement Cell which provides students the opportunity to interact with National and International organisations for facilitating the job opportunities and other activities related to their career advancement.

Organisation and administration

Governance  

Board of Management is the main policy making body responsible for the management of the university. The Governor of Haryana is the Chancellor of the university and the Honorary Chairman of the Board of Management. The Vice-Chancellor is the working chairman of the board, and is the principal executive and academic head of the university. Official members include the secretaries of agriculture, finance and community development of the Government of Haryana. Non-official members are also nominated by the Government of Haryana. Director of Agriculture and Director of Animal Husbandry of the Government of Haryana act as Technical Advisors whereas the Registrar is the Secretary of the Board.

The Office of the Registrar is responsible for academics, employees and faculty related affairs of the university. The Office of the Comptroller is responsible for finance, investment, budget and expenditure related affairs of the university and Directorate of Students Welfare is responsible for housing, boarding and welfare of the students and for various non-academic activities. The supreme academic authority is the Academic Council, chaired by the Vice-Chancellor. There are Board of Studies headed by Deans, one for each college in the university. There are some Non Statutory Committees to assist the general administration.

Colleges 
HAU has four colleges in the main campus at Hisar:
 College of Agriculture (CoA)
 College of Agricultural Engineering and Technology
 College of Basic Sciences & Humanities
 Indira Chakravarty College of Home Science
College of Fisheries Science (CoF)

Research stations
There are two additional research stations and colleges of Agriculture.

Kaul Agriculture Research stations
It is located at Kaul in Kaithal district.

Bawal Research stations
It is located at Jhabuwa near Bawal in Rewari district.

Regional centres

The university has research facilities spread throughout the state of Haryana.
 Eight Krishi Vigyan Kendras (Agricultural Science Centres) situated at Devigarh (Kaithal), Kurukshetra, Bhopani (Faridabad), Jagdispur (Sonepat), Sadalpur (Hisar) Jind, Ujha (Panipat )and Damla (Yamunanagar)
 Twelve Krishi Gyan Kendras (Agricultural Knowledge Centres) at Karnal, Rohtak, Jind, Ambala, Sirsa, Gurgaon, Sonipat, Bhiwani, Panchkula, Palwal (Faridabad), Hisar and Mahendragarh
 Regional Research Stations at Bawal (Rewari), Rohtak, Uchani (Karnal), Kaul (Kaithal), Buria (Yamunanagar), Ambala and Balsamand (Hisar)
 A Training Institute at Nilokheri Karnal.
 Six Disease Investigation Labs at Rohtak Ambala, Sirsa, Jind, Gurgaon and Karnal.

Associated institutions 
 Academy of Agricultural Research and Education Management
 Haryana Space Applications Centre, Hisar, a nodal agency of the Department of Science and Technology, Government of Haryana, for Remote Sensing and GIS applications.
 Centre on Plant Biotechnology, Hisar

Directorate

Farm Information and Communication Service

The Farm Information and Communication Service of the Directorate provides audio-visual and mass media support to the various wings, sections and departments of the university. Publication Unit: Like other units, publication unit including Press and Photography is also one of the important units. Monthly magazine Haryana Kheti, based on research evidences and experiences of the subject matter experts is published by the Unit. Other publications like Package of Practices Kharif, Rabi and Horticultural & Vegetable crops, Animal Husbandry and Home Science and other extension literature are published to provide need based, problem oriented information to the farming community. The magazine and other publications are supplied by the publication unit to the subscribers on payment basis. The University Press caters to the printing work of the university as a whole.

Agri-tourism Centre and farmers fair  

"Haryana State Farmer's and Agri-tourism Fair", simply called the "Kisan Mela", is an annual fair organised at HAU by this unit. It is largest fair of iots kind in the state. It entails "open house" visits to Agri-tourism Centre as well as at another location within HAU exhibition with stalls of various departments and suppliers of agri products and equipment. This is done to encourage agri-tourism, disseminate information to farmers, facilitate networking of farmers and farm input suppliers, buyers, food processing units, and consumers.

This unit also organizes exhibitions, such as Farm Darshan, at state, zonal and district levels in collaboration with other two wings of the Directorate & other departments/colleges.

Haryana Rural Antique Museum

The Haryana Rural Antique Museum in Gandhi Bhawan, established by this unit, exhibits evolution of agriculture and vanishing antiques.

Jahaj Kothi Museum, named after George Thomas, is located inside Firoz Shah Palace Complex and maintained by Archaeological Survey of India. The Rakhigarhi Indus Valley Civilisation Museum is located at Rakhigarhi, which is an Indus Valley civilisation site 60 km away, also has a museum developed by the state government.

Agri Business Incubation Centre (ABIC) 
The Agri Business Incubation Centre, CCSHAU was established as a business incubator with INR11.75 crore funding by the NABARD to encourage startup value-addition entrepreneurship, training and guidance to the youth. Its foundation stone was laid on 2 February 2018. To generate employment and to double the farmer's income, ABIC will act as single-window access for consultancy, incubation, initial business proposal development, procurement of resources and finance, risk mitigation, etc.

Agricultural Extension Centres (AEC)

The CCSHAU Directorate of Extension Education started establishing Krishi Gyan Kendra (Agricultural Knowledge Centres) in districts of the state of Haryana from 1966, with funding from Indian Council of Agricultural Research. In 1989, the new extension centres were named as Krishi Vigyan Kendra (Farm Service Centres) and since then one Krishi Vigyan Kendra (KVK) was established in each district of Haryana, to disseminate information and to provide vocational training in the relevant technologies among farmers, rural youth and rural development agencies. There are a total of 11 KGKs and 19 KVKs (c. 2012).

The first Kisan Sewa Kendra (Agricultural Technology Information Centre) was established at the university main campus in 2002, and currently there are a total of three Kisan Sewa Kendra (KSKs) (c. 2012) with Toll-free helpline agricultural services for the farmers. Seeds of various crops, fruits, vegetables, fertilisers and Animal products are provided to farmers at subsidised rates through these centres.

Deendyal Upadhaya Centre of Excellence for Organic Farming (DUCEOF) 
The non-profit Deendyal Upadhaya Centre of Excellence for Organic Farming, attached with the dairy, was established on 139 acres of land on 31 October 2017 to promote and impart the training in the organic farming. The organic produce will be sold in the National Capital Region.

Academics

Academic programmes
The institute offers undergraduate, postgraduate and doctoral programs. Undergraduate programs award BSc (Hons) and BTech in various agricultural fields. Postgraduate programmes award MSc, MTech and M.B.A. programme. and there is also PhD programme.

Admission
Admission to the undergraduate programmes (except BTech in Agricultural Engineering) is through a Common Entrance Test that includes questions on Physics, Chemistry and Biology/Mathematics/Agriculture. Admission is offered in July in order of merit in two counseling sessions. 75% of positions are offered to residents of Haryana, and the rest 25% are filled through an all-India entrance test organized by the Indian Council of Agricultural Research. The seats for BTech in Agricultural Engineering are filled through HSTES counselling based on result of  JEE exam by NTA and ICAR exam by Indian Council of Agricultural Research. Seats available for Haryana Residents are 41 and for ICAR students are 6 as of 2021.

Laboratories
The university has laboratories that provide facilities like DNA sequencing, UV trans-illuminator, PCR, FT-IR, gene gun, gene pulser, electron microscope, plasma spectrometer, X-ray diffraction, chromatography etc. Screen house, green house and transgenic green house are also available to researchers.

Experimental farms
These farms have both canal and tubewell irrigation facilities.

Printing Press
There is a full-fledged University Press to cater to the needs of printing of university publications like Haryana Kheti in Hindi and Haryana Farming in English. Besides above, several books in Hindi like Package of Practices for Rabi and Kharif Crops and Preservation, Package of Practices for Kharif Crops in English are printed in HAU Press. Some publications have also been printed on behalf of Commission for Scientific and Technical Terminology, Ministry of Human Resource Development, Govt. of India, New Delhi.

Research  
The university publishes the largest number of research papers among agricultural universities in India. It has four official publications: HAU Journal of Research, Haryana Veterinarian, Haryana Kheti, and Thesis Abstracts. A Kisan Mela (Farmers' Fair) is organized every year in March to promote the spread of agricultural technology among farmers. HAU has released about 250 varieties of wheat, barley, rice, maize, millets, forage crops, cash crops like sugarcane, cotton and oilseeds, medicinal plants, vegetables and horticulture. Extension department also runs a weather and crop advisory service for the farmers called eMausam.

Student life

Residential life 

Directorate of Students Welfare is responsible for providing residential facilities to the students. The university has a total of 14 hostels out of which 12 are located at Hisar. Out of 12 hostels located at Hisar, eight are for males, three for females and one for married students. There are separate for in-service and foreign students. There are two hostels, one each for males and females, at Kaul in Kaithal. The hostels have a total capacity of 1200 students. Aravali hostel is the oldest hostel of the university. Its construction started in 1958. It served as the Administrative Block of the university during the first year of the university.

Along with the official buildings, university has 1220 units of residential buildings (970 at Hisar and 242 at outstations) distributed into different categories. The hostel accommodation is sufficient enough to house each of the student on the university roll.  University has a two-room set married hostel for married students located in the residential complex.  Each hostel has a separate complex housing catering services and indoor games along with modern recreational and communication facilities like TV and Phone. University has a well-furnished Faculty House having facilities at par with the modern guest houses serving housing need of the national as well as international scientists visiting CCS HAU, Hisar. There is a farmers' hostel just close to the Faculty House with same level of facilities for the farmers visiting the university. The Faculty House of the university can provide accommodation to about 72 persons at a time. Similarly, farmers' hostel could accommodate about 76 persons at its full occupancy. In addition to these modern housing accommodations, there is spacious Kisan Ashram catering to the needs of the farmer trainees attending different short-term courses organized by the Directorate of Extension Education from time to time.

To serve the community needs of the faculty members, university has a spacious Faculty Club.  Similarly, there is a community centre in order to serve the community needs of the supporting staff. />

Medical Services

There is a well-equipped 50-bed hospital on the main campus at Hisar and 3 dispensaries at out-station i.e.  College of 

Agriculture, Kaul (Kaithal), Regional Research Stations, Karnal and Bawal. The hospital at main campus has 5 doctors and a dentist. Round-the-clock medical aid is provided to the students, staff and other trainees.

Clubs and societies 

Different clubs and societies have been formed to organise different extracurricular activities inside the university. Dramatics and Music Club is responsible for organising cultural activities. It was formed in 1973. The club presented Haryanvi folk dance in Indian Festival held at Moscow, Russia in 1986 and have participated in each All India Inter-Agricultural University Youth Festival ( AgriUniFest ) organised by Indian Council of Agricultural Research since its inception in 2000. It has won theatrical events at the festival four times and group songs events six times.

Graphic Arts Society and Literary Society are responsible for arts and literary activities. Graphics Art Society was established in 1970. It also offers photography as a co-curricular activity of the university course curriculum for undergraduate students. Many members of this society have won awards at the AgriUniFest. Students of Literary Society have been awarded in elocution, extempore and debate competitions at the AgriUniFest.

CCS HAU Mountaineering Club provides mountaineering opportunities to the students of the university. The club was started in the year 1971 and its motto is Youth for Adventure. The club offers trekking programs, seminars on mountain sports and, basic and advanced courses in rock climbing, mountaineering and skiing. in 2007, the club organised a motorbike expedition from Hisar to Khardung La, world's highest motorable pass. The club publishes its own online magazine known as HAUMC Magazine and also operates world's first trekking helpline. The club also organises humanitarian and voluntary activities such as awareness campaigns, environmental campaigns and fundraising events. The base of the club is located at the Giri Centre for Sports Activities of the university.

Other facilities 

National Cadet Corps and National Service Scheme (NSS) are available as credit activities in the university. NSS was established at the university in 1970. Many students of the university have been selected for Republic Day Parade and one student has been selected for International Youth Development Exchange Programme held in Tokyo, Japan. Counseling and Placement Centre provides placement opportunities whereas Alumni Association is responsible for handling alumni relations.

Directorate of Student Welfare
Director, Students' Welfare is responsible for making arrangements for housing, boarding and welfare of the students and various co-curricular activities other than the academic work. The Directorate of Students Welfare serves as a hub of students' guidance, counseling and placement activities for all its constituent colleges. Directorate helps CCS HAU graduates to get suitable placement in various nationalized banks, agro-based companies/industries/MNCs/NGOs etc. It facilitates students to pursue their higher education in India and abroad by conducting coaching classes, motivation lectures, mock group discussions, and interview simulations etc. The Directorate of Students' Welfare is also responsible for promotion of all co-curricular activities such as Sports, NCC, NSS, Mountaineering, Graphic Arts, Literary, Music, Dance, Drama, NIS, etc.  For promotion of these activities, various trainings are arranged from time to time.

Sports 

Directorate of Students Welfare is responsible for non-academic activities of the university. Sports Authority of India has established a Sports Training Center at HAU to impart training in Athletics, Boxing, Judo and Table tennis.

Giri Centre for Sports Activities

The Giri Centre, also housing Sports Authority of India's (SAI) "Sports Training Centre", for students sports activities is an outstanding feature of this university. Since 2001 it has dedicated "center of excellence" for several sports, including the "Center of Excellence for Wrestling" named after Sakshi Malik, hockey, boxing and judo. It also has two indoor badminton courts with a seating capacity for 600 spectators, an Olympic-size swimming pool, two indoor squash courts, hobby rooms, two multipurpose indoor gymnasium with a reasonable seating capacity. A synthetic athletics and hockey track of international standard has been built.

All the sports events of the university are held at Giri Centre. It has a cricket ground, a football ground and an athletics stadium with a synthetic track of international standard. A first-class match was played at the cricket stadium here between Haryana cricket team and Jammu and Kashmir cricket team on 11 November 1975 during the Ranji Trophy tournament.

University Handball Club 

Handball is a particularly popular sport at HAU and the university has its own Handball Club. The club won Gold medal at the All India Inter Varsity Handball Championship in 1988, Bronze medal at Senior National Handball Championship and are five times winner of Haryana State Handball Championships. The university has organised All India Inter Varsity Handball Championship once in 1988. Three players from the club have represented Indian handball team at international level and almost all the players of Haryana handball team belong to HAU.

Notable people

Notable alumni 
 Anil Kumar Gupta, professor in the Centre for Management in Agriculture at IIM, Ahmedabad, founder of Honey Bee Network, Executive VC of the NIF, (2004) Padma Shri National Award (management education).
 Sanjeev Balyan, Member of Parliament from Muzaffarnagar.
 Jagat Jakhar, Haryanvi film actor and main lead of the highest grossing Haryanvi film, Chandrawal.
 Harsh Vardhan Batra, former director of the Defence Food Research Laboratory

Notable faculty 
 Dr. Jai Bhagwan Chaudhary, Ex Vice-Chancellor of CCSHAU and GBPUA&T Pantnagar, recipient of the Padma Shri award.
 Anthony Leocadia Fletcher, Indian civil servant, First Vice-Chancellor of HAU.
 Megh R. Goyal, considered as father of irrigation engineering in Puerto Rico.
 Udey Chand, Arjuna Award recipient and first individual world championship medal winner from independent India.

Notable residents 
 Saina Nehwal, World Junior Badminton Championship champion and Rajiv Gandhi Khel Ratna recipient, student of CCS HAU Campus School.
 Yash Tonk, Indian actor, finalist of Nach Baliye 2, student of CCS HAU Campus School.

See also 
 State University of Performing And Visual Arts
 State Institute of Film and Television
 List of institutions of higher education in Haryana
 List of Universities and Colleges in Hisar
 List of agricultural universities and colleges

References

External links 
 

Research institutes in Hisar (city)
Agricultural universities and colleges in Haryana
Chaudhary Charan Singh Haryana Agricultural University
Educational institutions established in 1970
Universities and colleges in Hisar (city)
Memorials to Chaudhary Charan Singh
Agriculture in Haryana
1970 establishments in Haryana